Patrick Hume may refer to: 

 Patrick Hume of Polwarth (c. 1550–1609), Scottish courtier and poet of the Castalian Band
 Patrick Hume, 1st Earl of Marchmont (1641–1724), Scottish statesman
 Patrick Hume (editor) (fl. 1695), Scottish schoolmaster in London, author of the first commentary on John Milton's Paradise Lost